Dhikku Theriyadha Kaattil is a 1972 Indian Tamil-language film directed by N. C. Chakravarthi and produced by Ramkumar Films. The film's story was written by Nagesh, V. S. Raghavan and N. C. Chakravarthi and dialogue by Thuyavan with music by M. S. Viswanathan. The film stars R. Muthuraman, Jayalalithaa and Baby Sumathi. It was released on 11 February 1972.

Plot 

A child gets lost in a forest where various other groups of people enter, each with a different purpose.

Cast 

 Jayalalithaa as Vijaya
 R. Muthuraman as Vijaya's Husband
 Nagesh as Constable 1
 V. K. Ramasamy as Constable 2
 Baby Sumathi as Meena
 M. N. Nambiar as Prisoner Kali Muthu
 V. S. Raghavan as Prisoner Raju
 Major Sundarrajan as Williams, Hunter
Senthamarai as Police Inspector
 Sudharsan as Joseph, Hunter/Williams friend
 Sachu as Raji, College Student 1
 V. Gopalakrishan as Ganesh, College Student 2
  Vennira Aadai Moorthy as College Students 3
 Maali as Kailasam
 Kaathadi Ramamoorthy as College Student 4
 Jambu  as College Student 5
 Saibaba as College Student 6
 Pushpa as College Student 7
 Kalpana as College Student 8
 Sujatha as College Student 9
 Girija as College Student 10
 Lakshmi as College Student 11

Soundtrack 
Music was composed by M. S. Viswanathan and lyrics were written by Vaali.

Release and reception 
Dhikku Theriyatha Kaattil was released on 11 February 1972. Film World said, "The treatment is inane, in spite of the comedy patches provided by Nagesh and V. K. Ramaswami. The performances on the whole are mediocre." The film was later dubbed in Hindi as Barah Ghante.

References

External links 

1970s Tamil-language films
1972 films
Films about animals
Films scored by M. S. Viswanathan
Films set in forests